The Last Waltz (French:La dernière valse) is a 1936 French-British operetta film directed by Leo Mittler, and starring Jean Martinelli, Jarmila Novotna, and Armand Bernard. It was based on the 1920 operetta The Last Waltz by Oscar Straus.

The film was made at the Billancourt Studios in Paris. A separate version was also released in Britain.

The film's sets were designed by Robert Gys.

Cast
 Jean Martinelli as Le comte Dimitri
 Jarmila Novotna as La comtesse Véra-Élisabétha Opalinsky
 Armand Bernard as Le vieux général
 Gerald Barry as Le prince Paul
 Josephine Huntley Wright as Babouchka 
 Alla Donell 
 Gautier-Sylla 
 Robert Goupil 
 Robert Guillon 
 Betty Huntley-Wright 
 Charlotte Lysès 
 Marthe Mellot 
 Pierre Piérade 
 Paul Sheridan 
 Nora Souané

See also
 The Last Waltz (1927)
 The Last Waltz (1934)
 The Last Waltz (UK, 1936)
 The Last Waltz (1953)

References

Bibliography
 Kristian Feigelson. Caméra politique: cinéma et stalinisme. Presses Sorbonne Nouvelle, 2005.

External links
 

1936 films
1936 musical films
French musical films
1930s French-language films
Films directed by Leo Mittler
Films shot at Billancourt Studios
Operetta films
Films based on operettas
French multilingual films
Remakes of German films
Films set in Russia
Films set in the 1900s
French black-and-white films
Films scored by Oscar Straus
British musical films
British black-and-white films
1936 multilingual films
1930s British films
1930s French films